Verticordia insignis  is a species of flowering plant in the myrtle family, Myrtaceae and is endemic to the south-west of Western Australia. It is an open, irregularly-branched shrub with small leaves and heads of relatively large pink, or white and pink flowers on the ends of the branches in spring.

Description
Leaves near the flowers tend to be wider than those further down the stems.

Flowering mostly occurs from September to November.

Taxonomy and naming
Verticordia insignis was first formally described by Stephen Endlicher in 1837 and the description was published in Enumeratio plantarum quas in Novae Hollandiae ora austro-occidentali ad fluvium Cygnorum et in sinu Regis Georgii collegit Carolus Liber Baro de Hügel from specimens found near the Swan River by Carl von Huegel.

When Alex George reviewed the genus in 1991, he placed this species in subgenus Verticordia, section Catocalypta along with V. roei, V. apecta, V. inclusa, V. habrantha, V. lehmannii and V. pritzelii.

In the same review, George described three subspecies of V. insignis:
 Verticordia insignis subsp. compta  A.S.George  is similar to subsp. insignis but has pink sepals, shorter stamens , and much shorter styles  and shorter upper leaves ;
 Verticordia insignis subsp. eomagis  A.S.George  has longer sepals , slightly longer petals , longer stamens  and a longer style  than the other two subspecies.

The specific epithet (insignis) is a Latin word meaning "remarkable", "notable" or "eminent".

Distribution and habitat
This verticordia often grows in association with other species of verticordia in grey or yellow sand near rocks in heath and woodland. It occurs along the Darling Scarp and inland as far as Northam and Brookton in the Avon Wheatbelt, Coolgardie, Jarrah Forest, Mallee, Geraldton Sandplains and Swan Coastal Plain biogeographic regions.

Conservation status
The two subspecies insignis and compta are classified as "not threatened" by the Western Australian Government Department of Parks and Wildlife but subspecies eomagis is classified as "Priority Three" meaning that it is poorly known and known from only a few locations but is not under imminent threat.

Use in horticulture
This verticordia has horticultural potential because of its flowers, described as "outstandingly beautiful, resembling miniature powder puffs". It has been propagated from cuttings but establishing them in the garden has been difficult.

References

External links

insignis
Rosids of Western Australia
Eudicots of Western Australia
Plants described in 1837
Taxa named by Stephan Endlicher